The Chennai Metro is a rapid transit system serving the city of Chennai, Tamil Nadu, India. It is the 4th longest metro system in India. The system commenced service in 2015 after partially opening the first phase of the project. The Chennai Metro Rail Limited (CMRL), a joint venture between Government of India and the Government of Tamil Nadu built and operates the Chennai Metro. The system has a mix of underground and elevated stations and uses standard gauge. The services operate daily between 5:30 and 21:00 with a varying frequency of 2 to 8 minutes.

History

Background
Chennai had an established Chennai Suburban Railway network that spanned from Beach to Tambaram, which dates back to 1931 and operated on a metre-gauge line. This service is now being continued after conversion to broad gauge line up to Chengalpattu. The suburban network also consists of two more suburban lines, the west bound Chennai Central–Arakkonam suburban service and the north bound Chennai Central–Gummidipoondi. 

The first phase of Chennai Mass Rapid Transit System, India's first elevated line between Chennai Beach and Thirumayilai, opened in 1995 with an extension to Velachery in 2007. Modeled after the Delhi Metro, a similar modern metro rail system was planned for Chennai by Delhi Metro chief E. Sreedharan.

Infrastructure

Phase 1

Planning
In 2007–08,  was sanctioned for preliminary work, which included a Detailed Project Report to be prepared by the Delhi Metro Rail Corporation. The project was approved by the state cabinet on 7 November 2007 and was to be executed by a Special Purpose Vehicle, the Chennai Metro Rail Limited (CMRL) covering two lines for 40 km with 30 km being underground. Seven lines were planned by the DMRC for the Chennai Metro network. Planning commission gave in-principle approval for the project on 16 April 2008. On 21 November 2009, a deal was signed with the Japan Banking Corporation for a loan.

Construction and Commencement of services 

The construction started on 10 June 2009 with the piling work for the elevated viaduct between Koyambedu and Ashok Nagar stretch.

In June, tenders for the elevated stations of the first phase were awarded to Consolidated Construction Consortium Limited.

In January 2011, a  contract for design and construction of track works was awarded to a joint venture of L&T and Alstom and a  contract for supply of lifts and escalators was awarded to a joint venture of Johnson Lifts and SJEC Corporation. In February 2011, contracts were awarded for the construction of underground sections of the first phase.

In July 2012, the first tunnel boring machine was launched and by October 2012, eleven machines were commissioned to bore tunnels along the underground stretch by three consortiums, namely Afcons-Transtonnelstroy, L&T and SUCG, Gammon India and Mosmetrostroy involved in the construction. On 6 November 2013, the test run along a stretch of  track was conducted. On 14 February 2014, the maiden trial run for the metro was conducted between the Koyambedu and Ashok Nagar stations. In August 2014, the metro received the statutory speed certification clearance from the Research Design and Standards Organisation. In January 2015, a report was submitted to the Commissioner of Metro Rail Safety for approval. In April 2015, the Commissioner of Metro Rail Safety inspected the rolling stock and submitted a report to the Railway Board. On 29 June 2015, commercial operations started between Alandur and Koyambedu stations  and almost a year later, on 21 September 2016, commercial operations commenced between Chennai International Airport metro station and Little Mount by the then Chief Minister J. Jayalalithaa. Commercial operations commenced in the first underground line between Thirumangalam metro station to Nehru Park metro station on 14 May 2017  and the underground stretches – Nehru Park metro station to Chennai Central metro station and Saidapet metro station to AG-DMS metro station were opened a year later on 25 May 2018 by the then Chief Minister Edappadi K. Palaniswami. On 10 February 2019, the underground stretch from AG-DMS to Washermanpet of blue line was opened by Prime Minister Narendra Modi, completing  phase 1 of the metro.

Phase 1: Extension 
The government planned a  northern extension of the Blue Line running from Washermanpet metro station to Wimco Nagar. The line runs underground for the first  until Tondiarpet after which it becomes elevated along the Thiruvottriyur high road and consists of a total of nine stations.

Construction started in July 2016 after approval by the Central government. The trial runs were conducted successfully in December 2020 and the line opened for passenger traffic on 14 February 2021 by Prime minister Narendra Modi.

Tunneling
Tunnels for the Chennai Metro were drilled using Tunnel boring machines (TBMs) brought from Russia and China. In December 2011, two TBMs were shipped to Chennai from China. A total of 120 TBMs were deployed from July 2012, 80 from Germany, 20 from China, and 10 each from the United States and Japan. The first tunnel work commenced in July 2012 from Nehru Park to Egmore for a distance of 948 meters. By December 2017, upon completion of the tunneling work of the Chennai Metro, all the machines were shipped backed to their origin countries. Each TBM weighed 850 tonnes and was able to drill hard surfaces, creating tunnel passages to connect underground stations. The length of the TBMs was about 85 to 90 meters. Tunnels were bored 50 feet below the surface, and each kilometer of tunneling cost  10,000 million. The average length of tunneling was 16 to 18 meters a day.

Financials 
The phase 1 extension costed 30,000 crores with 60 percent funded by JICA.

Phase 2

Planning & Constructions 
E. Sreedharan, in 2013, stressed on the need of a greater expansion of Chennai metro network by undertaking subsequent phases. In July 2016, the then Chief Minister J. Jayalalithaa announced that Chennai Metro Phase 2 would be 180 km long and have 180 stations. In July 2017, in a suo motu statement in the State Legislative Assembly, an extension in Phase II, involving an extension of Line 4 from Lighthouse up to Poonamallee, with the Madhavaram–Sholinganallur and Lighthouse–Poonamallee lines intersecting at Alwarthirunagar was announced, making Phase 2 180 km long. The key focus for Phase 2 is to connect the northern (Madhavaram, Thiruvottriyur, Redhills) and southern parts (Siruseri, Sholinganallur) and the east parts of Chennai (Light house, Mylapore) to the western parts of Chennai (Porur, Poonamallee). Tamil Nadu Road Development Corporation (TNRDC) has also proposed an elevated  four-lane corridor for the IT corridor from Taramani to Siruseri. CMRL will construct its piers on top of the flyover built by TNRDC.

The lines 3, 4 and 5 are proposed to have   underground and  elevated routes. The present estimate for the phase 2 stands at 120,000 crore and approval has been received from the state government. Foundation stone for phase 2 was laid on 20 November 2020 by Union Home Minister Amit Shah and construction commenced on 1 June 2021. The construction work for certain sections of the second phase of Chennai Metro Rail project is hit due to delay in the selection of the general consultant (GC) after concerns were raised by more than 50% of bidders on the CMRL shortlisting companies based on their technical qualifications. Addressing an event in Chennai, Prime Minister Narendra Modi on Sunday 14 February 2021 said the Centre has set aside 63,000 crore in this year’s Budget for the second phase of Chennai Metro totaling 180 km, which is one of the largest projects sanctioned for any city in one-go. The map and list of stations for all 3 proposed lines to be part of Phase 2 has also been published by CMRL. Phase 2 will have trains with six and 10 coaches, making a total of 15,400 coaches.

Phase 2 Extensions

Financials 
Phase 2 is to be funded partially by JICA, AIIB, ADB and NDB.

Future Plans

MRTS Takeover 
The 25 km long Chennai Mass Rapid Transit System is likely to be handed over to CMRL by the Southern Railway. The entire system from Mount–Velachery–Beach will be upgraded as a broad gauge metro with all the facilities of the metro stations which includes tracks, security, ticketing system and the rolling stock (Air conditioned). On 11 May 2022, Southern Railway granted in-principle approval for the Chennai Metro to takeover the MRTS.

Chennai Metro Extension & Expansion 
List of projects that the CMRL holds for future development in Chennai include Chennai Metrolite, Chennai Metro phase 1 southern extension, construction of Central Square, various commercial complexes and multi-storied buildings along CMRL's land, construction of metro depots. Chennai Metro phase 3 as envisaged in the Chennai Comprehensive Mobility Plan, and so forth.

Metro Plans in Other Cities in Tamil Nadu 
Projects that CMRL holds for future development in Tamil Nadu include Coimbatore Metro, Tiruchirapalli Metro, Madurai Metro, Salem Metro, Tirunelveli Metro and Hosur Metro (Namma Metro Yellow Line Extension)

Network

Current map

Under Construction

Proposed Expansions

Lines

Blue Line 

The Blue Line or Line 1 is a operational line which stretches from Chennai International Airport to Wimco Nagar Depot. The line consists of 40 stations out of which 28 stations are underground and 12 stations are elevated.

Green Line 

The Green Line or Line 2 is a operational line which stretches from Chennai Central to St. Thomas Mount. Out of the 30 stations, 15 stations are underground and 15 are elevated.

Purple Line 

Purple or Line 3 is under construction line, it stretches from Madhavaram Milk Colony to Siruseri Sipcot 2. The line will consist of 48 (51) stations, out of which 28 (30) are underground and 20 (21) are elevated.

Orange Line 

Orange Line or Line 4 is under construction line which stretches from Light House to Poonamallee Bypass. The line will consist of 31 (29) stations, out of which 9 (12) are underground and 19 are elevated.

Red Line 

Red Line or Line 5 part of phase II is under construction line stretches from Madhavaram Milk Colony to Sholinganallur. The line will consist of 49 stations, out of which 7 are underground, 1 at grade and 41 are elevated.

Operations

The rail tracks were manufactured in Brazil and the raw material was supplied by Tata Steel. Chennai Metro operates trains from 3:00 AM to 12:00 AM with a frequency of one train every 2.5 minutes in peak hours and every 5 minutes in lean hours. CMRL plans to increase the frequency to one train every 1.5 minutes once footfalls reach 6,000,000 passengers a day.

Ticketing
The minimum fare is  10 and the maximum fare is  50.

There are five types of tickets issued by CMRL for travel in Chennai metro.

They are

1. Single journey tokens, which need to be purchased each time for every journey at the ticket counter or in ticket vending machines available at all stations. The rates vary between ₹30 and ₹120 for one journey. Alternatively, single and return journey tickets can be bought through the CMRL app with QR code ticket scanners at stations.

2. Stored value cards (SVC) are pre-paid, rechargeable, travel cards that can be purchased at any ticket counter against a refundable deposit of ₹50. They can be recharged up to a maximum of ₹2000 at any ticket counter or in automated ticket vending machines available at all stations. Frequent users of Chennai metro can use this card. A discount of 20% is applicable for the users of SVC. Therefore, the rates vary between ₹24 and ₹96 for a single journey.

3. Trip Cards are for persons traveling between the same two stations regularly. The fares are discounted by 20% and are available in 3 types namely, 10 trips valid for 30 days, 30 trips valid for 90 days, and 60 trips valid for 180 days.

4. Tourist Cards provide the cardholders unlimited rides on the Chennai Metro for 1 day. It costs ₹150 of which ₹50 is refundable on returning the card. This is ideal for persons visiting the city for a short period of time and planning to travel to their destinations by metro.

5. "Singara Chennai" One City One Card under NCMC scheme powered by SBI support coming soon

CMRL announced that starting from the Diwali day, 27 October 2019, there will be a discount of 50% for all journeys taken on Sundays and public holidays. This discount will be applicable with single journey tokens (₹15 to ₹90) and Stored Value Cards (₹36 to ₹81).

Order of operation

Administration and maintenance

The depot houses maintenance workshops, stabling lines, a test track and a washing plant for the trains . It also houses the Operational Control Centre (OCC) where the movement of trains and real-time CCTV footages obtained from the stations and on-board cameras is monitored. The company is building a headquarters building near Nandanam. Maintenance includes preventing corrosion of train surfaces due to bird droppings, the depot has been fitted with ultrasonic bird repellers and bird strobe lights to prevent birds from entering the depot.

An elevated depot at Wimco Nagar covering an area of 3.5 ha, with provision to station 12 trains commenced operations in 2022. The facilities in the depot include three inspections lines, one emergency repair line, and a small plant for washing trains. There are also plans to build a multi-storey commercial building above the depot.

Timings

Infrastructure

Rolling Stock
The trains have a first-class compartment and a women's section with 200 seats in the first-class car and 500 seats in the normal car. As a part of phase 1 extension Alstom further supplied 10 trains with 4 coaches each making a total of 520 coaches operating in phase 1 and its extension. The trains are air-conditioned with electrically operated automatic sliding doors and a regenerative braking system.

Power
The trains are connected to the grid via overhead electric cables and are equipped with regenerative braking with a capacity to recover 30–35% of the energy during braking. The metro will require an average of 70 MW of power daily and the electricity will be supplied by Tamil Nadu Electricity Board. Chennai Metro is also planning to use solar power for five of its stations on the elevated corridor, with a production capacity of 200 KW.

Stations

A total of 32 stations have been constructed along the two lines of the Phase 1 with 20 underground stations. Phase 1 extension has a total of 8 stations with 2 underground stations. In the underground sections, a walkway runs along the length with cross passages every  for the maintenance and emergency evacuation.

However, the length of the stations, both underground and elevated, in Phase 1 extension is only  to save space. Underground stations have two levels and are air-conditioned. The metro stations are equipped to be disabled and elderly friendly, with automatic fare collection system, announcement system, electronic display boards, escalators and lifts. The stations are equipped with non-slippery flooring with grip-rails, audio announcements and Braille facilities to help visually challenged passengers. Paid parking facilities are available for two wheelers at all but three stations and in select stations for four wheelers. parking charges can be paid for through the stored value cards.

Gallery

Connections

The metro system will provide connections with various other transportation modes in the city.

 Chennai Suburban Railway: Wimco Nagar, Washermanpet, Chennai Fort, Chennai Park, Chennai Egmore, Chennai Chetpet, Kodambakkam, Perambur, Dr. M.G.R. Chennai Central, Guindy, Meenambakkam, Villivakkam, Tirusulam and St Thomas Mount
 Chennai MRTS: Chennai Fort, Park Town, Chintadripet, Thiruvanmiyur, Thirumayilai and St Thomas Mount
 Chennai Metropolitan Transport Corporation: Broadway, Chennai Egmore, Poonamalle, Iyyapanthangal, Mandaiveli, Adyar Depot, Dr. M.G.R. Chennai Central, Tollgate, Thiruvottriyur, Anna Nagar, Puratchi Thalaivar Dr. M.G.R. Bus Terminus, Madhavaram Bus Terminus, Anna Nagar Depot, Vadapalani, Ashok Nagar, DMS, Saidapet, Guindy and St Thomas Mount
 Southern Railway: Dr. M.G.R. Chennai Central, Egmore and Tambaram
 Chennai International Airport
 State Express Transport Corporation: Puratchi Thalaivar Dr. M.G.R. Bus Terminus
 Tamil Nadu State Transport Corporation: Puratchi Thalaivar Dr. M.G.R. Bus Terminus, Vadapalani and Guindy

Accidents and Incidents
In August 2012, a construction worker was killed and six others were seriously injured due to a crane boom failure near Pachaiyappa's College. On 10 January 2013, a 22-year-old construction worker was killed and three others were injured at a metro rail site on Railway Station Road between Alandur and St Thomas Mount. On 11 January 2014, a crane toppled over, killing a 20-year-old construction worker and seriously injuring one other worker. The accident took place at 6:45 am at the construction site of the Saidapet station. On 17 June 2015, a 30-year-old man was killed on the spot and another motorcyclist injured when an iron rod fell on them at an under construction metro rail station near Officers Training Academy at St. Thomas Mount around 9:00 am.

Criticisms 
Chennai Metro is the second most expensive in terms of ticket cost per kilometer in the country after Mumbai. The fares were slashed by up to  20 by the then Chief Minister Edappadi K. Palaniswami in February 2021, with the maximum fare capped at  40. In 2019, the Madras High Court questioned the state government on the scientific method it adopted in constructing the tunnels without disturbing the water bodies in the city.

National Project Excellence Award 
Chennai Metro Mail Limited (CMRL) was awarded the "National Project Excellence Award" on 20 August 2019. This award was conferred by the Project Management Associates (PMA) India, and presented by Amitabh Kant, the CEO of NITI Aayog. The award was for the successful completion and commencement of passenger services for entire Phase-1 project in an extremely challenging condition, through the usage of cutting-edge engineering practices, while keeping public safety as a priority.

Network Map

See also

References

External links

 

 
2015 establishments in Tamil Nadu
Transport in Chennai
Government of Chennai
Airport rail links in India
25 kV AC railway electrification
Standard gauge railways in India
Railway lines opened in 2015